A kitharode (Latinized citharode)
(  and κιτηαρῳδός) or citharist,
was a classical Greek professional performer (singer) of the cithara, as one who used the cithara to accompany their singing. Famous citharodes included Terpander, Sappho, and Arion.

"Citharoedus" or "Citharede" was also an epithet of Apollo (Apollo Citharede), and the term is used to refer to statues which portray Apollo with his lyre.

See also

Relevant musical instruments

Related type of statuary
 Apollo Citharoedus

Footnotes

References

Ancient Greek music